Spororminula is a genus of fungi in the family Sporormiaceae. This is a monotypic genus, containing the single species Spororminula tenerifae.

References

Pleosporales
Monotypic Dothideomycetes genera